Operation Eagle Eye (Serbian: Operacija Orlovo oko) was the result of the NATO-Kosovo Verification Mission Agreement which was signed in Belgrade on October 15, 1998, and under which the Federal Republic of Yugoslavia agrees to establish an air surveillance system consisting of NATO non-combatant reconnaissance aircraft and unmanned aerial vehicles.

When a NATO "activation order" was given and dated October 30, 1998, it marked the official launch of this high-tech verification mission. The aim was to monitor the federal Yugoslav government's compliance with United Nations Security Council Resolution 1199, and in particular the withdrawal of armed forces from Kosovo and compliance with the ceasefire.

About 80 aircraft took part in Operation Eagle Eye. 4 of whom are German Tornado fighter planes. This was also the first time since the Second World War that the German Army was used. The monitors consisted of 1,400 ground observers. The Serbs did not comply with the resolutions and agreements.

As a result of Yugoslav troop activities and other forms of non-compliance, the ground observers withdrew citing "an unacceptable level of risk to the peace support verification mission", which resulted in an end to aerial verification on March 24, 1999.

Background 
The background to NATO's intervention is the brutal repression, expulsion and murder of the Albanian population in Kosovo. Foreign Minister Joschka Fischer calls this self-mandate of NATO a "very big exception". The General Secretary, Kofi Annan, acknowledged that "excessive and indiscriminate use of force by the Serbian security forces and the Yugoslav Army has resulted in numerous civilian casualties and...the displacement of more than 230,000 people from their homes." These words were incorporated into United Nations Security Council Resolution 1199 passed on September 23, that demanded a ceasefire in Kosovo, dialogue between the warring parties, the end of action by security forces against civilians, and the safe return of refugees back to Kosovo.

Operation 
The monitors consisted of 1,400 ground observers, as well as 80 aircraft to patrol the Yugoslav Army. It lasted for 5 months and 26 days until it was terminated on March 24, 1999. Michael E. Short commanded the operation.

Termination 
When Operation Eagle Eye was created, Serbs did not comply with the terms that quickly. Yugoslav troops began to do activities and other forms of non-compliance which forced all 1400 ground observers to withdraw form Kosovo and the operation was terminated.

References 



Kosovo War
NATO-led peacekeeping in the former Yugoslavia